The Moorish Barracks is a historical barracks in São Lourenço, Macau, China.

In 2005, the barracks became of the designated historical sites of the Historic Centre of Macau, a UNESCO World Heritage Site.

History
The barracks was built in August 1874 to accommodate a regiment from Goa, Portuguese India. It was designed by an Italian architect. In 1905, it was turned into the headquarters of Macau Port Authority. The building now houses the headquarter of Marine and Water Bureau.

Architecture
The barracks is built with bricks and neo-classical structure on the slope of Barra Hill. It has Mughal architecture with 67.5 meters length and 37 meters width. The rear side of the building consists of two stories and the other part of the building consists of one story. The exterior of the building is painted in yellow and white.

See also
 List of tourist attractions in Macau

References

Buildings and structures in Macau
1874 establishments in China
1874 establishments in the Portuguese Empire
19th-century establishments in Macau
Macau Peninsula
Macau
Portuguese colonial architecture in China